Bertie the Bunyip was the lead puppet character on the popular American children's television series The Bertie the Bunyip Show which aired on KYW-TV in Philadelphia, Pennsylvania, which ran from 1954 to 1966. He was portrayed as a brown-colored character with the ears of a kangaroo and a duck-bill-type snout. For children he was cute and friendly, getting into harmless situations.

Created by Australian born and raised ventriloquist Lee Dexter (1904-1991), Bertie was a bunyip (a mythological Australian creature), described by Dexter as "a cross between a bunny, a collie dog and a duck billed platypus."

Bertie's enemy was an aristocratic fox by the name of Sir Guy de Guy and his friends included Nixie the Pixie, Humphrey the white rabbit, Winnie the Witch, Poochie the Pup and those terrible twos Fussy and Gussy.

A newspaper article published shortly after his death featured an interview with Lee Dexter, who noted that Sir Guy was named after the ubiquitous TV Guide - but this turned out to be just another bogus attempt to cash in on the notoriety of Dexter's puppets, and there was a protracted struggle for ownership of the puppets.  Dexter suffered from Alzheimer's Disease in his later years and was confined to a nursing home in southern New Jersey; he was unable to shed any light on his puppets including who should get them.

Further reading
 Hi There, Boys and Girls!: America's Local Children's TV Programs by Tim Hollis, University Press of Mississippi (2010)
 Row House Days: Tales from a Southwest Philadelphia Childhood by Jack Myers, Infinity Publishing (2005)

References

External links
 Definitive exposition of the LD/BTB relationship
 BTB at TV land
 nice pic of Lee and Bertie
 Imaginative use of BTB's legacy

Television series about rabbits and hares
Local children's television programming in the United States
Television in Philadelphia
American television shows featuring puppetry